Michel Portmann (born 26 August 1941) is a Swiss athlete. He competed in the men's high jump at the 1968 Summer Olympics.

References

External links
 

1941 births
Living people
Athletes (track and field) at the 1968 Summer Olympics
Swiss male high jumpers
Olympic athletes of Switzerland
Place of birth missing (living people)